Thomas Metcalfe or Metcalf may refer to:

Thomas Metcalfe (courtier), medieval Chancellor of the Duchy of Lancaster
Thomas Metcalfe (Kentucky politician) (1780–1855), governor of Kentucky, also known as Thomas Metcalf
Sir Thomas Metcalfe, 1st Baronet (1745–1813), Director of the East India Company, MP for Abingdon
Sir Thomas Metcalfe, 4th Baronet (1795–1853), East India Company servant, agent to Governor General of India, son of the above
Tom Metcalf (born 1940), baseball player
Tom Metcalf (footballer) (1878–1938), English footballer who played for Southampton and Wolverhampton Wanderers
Thomas R. Metcalf (born 1934), historian of South Asia
T. Nelson Metcalf (1890–1982), American football and basketball player, coach and college athletics administrator
Thomas Humphrey Metcalfe (c. 1761–1790), American maritime fur trader
Thomas Metcalf (Massachusetts politician), representative to the Great and General Court